Serie A2, known for sponsorship reasons as Serie A2 Old Wild West, is a men's basketball league in Italy. It constitutes the second-tier of the Italian league pyramid, below the first division LBA and above the third division Serie B, with promotion/relegation occurring between these leagues.

It is run by the Lega Nazionale Pallacanestro (LNP), itself regulated by the FIP, the Italian federation.

Names

History 

The league was created in May 1974, by the Lega Basket, the organisation in charge of running the LBA (to this day), that decided to create a new second division with 10 clubs. The two that were relegated during that season, and 8 from the now-former second tier Serie B, chosen with an on and off the court criteria.

The 1975–76 season saw 12 clubs take part, after a complicated system had seen a transfer of clubs from the Serie A1 to the A2.

In June 2001, the LegaDue was created to replace the Serie A2. Lega Basket now took part in running the league, though a system of promotion and relegation between the leagues remained.

During the 2013 summer, another revamp was decided. The LegaDue was amalgamated with the third division DNA, to form a two-tiered league, the DNA (Divisione Nazionale A) Gold and DNA Silver. The two DNA's had separate season's, but the first ranked team in DNA Silver joined the seven best Gold teams to compete for the single promotion spot in the Serie A. The next best eight Silver squads fought for one spot in the next Gold season, whilst the three worst teams were relegated.

The next season saw the league retake its Serie A2 moniker, keeping a similar but tweaked hybrid model, with the eight best Gold and the four best Silver teams taking part in the promotion playoffs (still for the one spot), whilst the last two Gold and the penultimate and ante-penultimate Silver squads play a relegation play out (the last ranked Silver team was relegated outright).

Competition format 
For the 2015–16 season, the Serie A2 Basket is composed of 32 teams with a regional subdivision in two equal groups of sixteen, East and West.

Each team plays the others in its subgroup twice, the first ranked team of each group then plays the eighth ranked team of the other group (e.g. East #1 against West #8), then the second best against the seventh, and so on, to form a promotion playoffs (for one place) of sixteen teams.

Since the 2018–19 season the Playoffs winner is the third promoted team to LBA. The two other promoted clubs, which are also the top seeded on the League Table at the end of the Regular Season, have to face a final of two matches to decide the winner of the Serie A2.

Since the 2019–20 season the Playoffs winners (2 tournaments) are promoted to LBA.

Current clubs (2020-2021)

League champions

MVP

Best Coach

See also
Italian LNP Cup

Notes

References

External links
Official website 

  
2
Italy
1974 establishments in Italy